The Lisbon Christmas tree is an Artificial Christmas tree erected annually in Lisbon, Portugal since 2004.

From 2005, when it was an entrant in the Guinness World Records, the tree is called Europe's tallest Christmas tree.

The tree was erected for the first time in Lisbon in 2004 in the Comercio Square. In 2007 it left the Portuguese capital for Porto the country’s second largest city. In 2008 it returned to Lisbon but to the Edward VII Park.

In 2007, the Lisbon Christmas tree and the Christmas tree in Bucharest, Romania, both at 76 metres high, competed for the title of the tallest Christmas tree in Europe. The Lisbon Christmas Tree kept its title as no Christmas tree was erected in Bucharest in 2009.

References

2004 establishments in Portugal
Recurring events established in 2004
Individual Christmas trees
Culture in Lisbon
Tourist attractions in Lisbon
Christmas traditions in Europe
Individual trees in Portugal
Annual events in Lisbon